Adalberto Ortiz - born Adalberto Ortiz Quiñones  (February 9, 1914 – February 1, 2003) was a novelist, poet and diplomat born in Esmeraldas, a province of Ecuador.

Among his most important literary works we find his novel Juyungo (1942; English translation by Susan Hill and Jonathan Tittler 1983), his poetry collection Earth, Sound and Drum (1953), and the short story collection called Entundada (1971); His most defining feature as a writer was the incorporation of the elements of afro-American culture, enriching his literary vocabulary with its jargon, its elasticity and its rhythm.

Ortiz's thematic focused around the identity of the afro-American within Latin-American society and its struggle towards social freedom, against oppression and secular exploitation. His body of work also preserves and rescues the elements of the psychology, idiosyncrasy, customs and slang of the afro-American culture.

Facing the subject of the difference between classes, Ortiz used his characters to personalize and flesh out these political themes into very human and realistic stories. A specific point he touches in the novel Juyungo, for example, is the relationship of the Black and Mestizo races (personified by Lastre's descendant and the Mestizo Diaz).

Outside of the aspects of social commentary, Ortiz's prose is celebrated and acclaimed as possessing singular beauty and elegance.

In 1995 the Ecuadorian Government awarded him with the Eugenio Espejo National Prize celebrating the entirety of his work.

Published works

Novels and short stories
Juyungo (Buenos Aires, 1943) – (English translation by Susan Hill and Jonathan Tittler, Three Continents Press, Inc, Washington D.C., 1983)
El espejo y la ventana -National Award of the Journalist Union (Quito, 1967)
La envoltura del sueño (Guayaquil, 1982)
Los contrabandistas (México, 1945)
La mala espalda (Quito, 1952)
La entundada (Quito, 1971)

Poetry
Tierra son y tambor (México, 1945)
Camino y puerto de la angustia (México, 1945)
El vigilante insepulto (Quito, 1954)
El animal herido -antología- (Quito, 1959)
Fórmulas. Tierra Son y Tambor (Quito, 1973)
La niebla encendida (Quito, 1983)
El perro que se mana la mierda (aluncia, 2014)

Anthologies
Consta en las antologías: El nuevo relato ecuatoriano (Quito, 1951)
Antología del cuento hispanoamericano contemporáneo (Quito, 1958)
Antología del relato ecuatoriano (Quito, 1973)
Cuento de la generación de los 30 (Guayaquil)
Antología del cuento ecuatoriano (Lima, 1974)
Cuentos hispanoamericanos, Ecuador (Quito, 1992)
Cuento contigo (Quito, 1993)
Antología básica del cuento ecuatoriano (Quito, 2001).

External links
Monsters and the Monstruous, the second session analyses "La Tunda" by Ortiz
"Los Ojos Y La Fea", a PDF ebook of one of Ortiz's short stories
Exhaustive Spanish biography
Complete Spanish biography by Rodolfo Pérez Pimentel

References
Smith, Ronna (1949–). "Prosa de Ortiz: bibliografía." Cultura 6:16 (mayo/ago. 1983): 197–210.

Ecuadorian male writers
1914 births
2003 deaths
People from Esmeraldas, Ecuador